Adriana Gjoni (Gjonaj) was a member of the Assembly of the Republic of Albania for the Democratic Party of Albania.

References

Year of birth missing (living people)
Living people
Democratic Party of Albania politicians
21st-century Albanian politicians
21st-century Albanian women politicians
Members of the Parliament of Albania
Women members of the Parliament of Albania